HD 122430 is single star in the equatorial constellation of Hydra. It has an orange hue and is faintly visible to the naked eye with an apparent visual magnitude of 5.47. The star is located at a distance of 105.6 light years from the Sun based on parallax.

This is an aging giant star with a stellar classification of K2–3III. It has completely run out of the hydrogen fuel that keeps it stable, although it is only two billion years old, younger than the Sun's 4.6 billion years. HD 122430 has a mass of 1.6 times and radius of 22.9 times that of the Sun. Despite its younger age, it has slightly lower metallicity, approximately 90%. It is radiating 190 times the luminosity of the Sun from its photosphere at an effective temperature of 4300 K.

A candidate exoplanet was reported orbiting the star via the radial velocity method at a conference in 2003, and designated HD 122430 b. However, a follow-up study by Soto et al. (2015) failed to detect a signal, so it remains unconfirmed.

See also 
 HD 47536
 List of extrasolar planets

References

K-type giants
Hydra (constellation)
Durchmusterung objects
122430
068581
5265